Benjamin Banneker Academy for Community Development (usually called Banneker) is a public high school located in the Clinton Hill section of Brooklyn, New York City. The school was originally a Drake's Cakes factory. Still today, different floors of the school are in Drake's colors, blue and yellow. It has a small, but family type atmosphere for a high school. It is usually called a junior college because the faculty and students are so focused on college.  Banneker, which serves grades 9 through 12+, is operated by the New York City Department of Education. Many of the graduates attend SUNY schools, HBCUs (historically black colleges and universities) and CUNY schools. There are also a few that attend Ivy League schools and a few are recruited for Posse schools. The school's graduation rate has been at least 90% since 2002.

School information
The school's colors are black and gold. Each year Banneker holds a homecoming party for the students in which they wear the school colors. This event is usually the final event to their School Spirit Week, which places a different theme on each day of that week. Some of the themes include Twin Day, "Celebrity Look A Like Day", and Flag Day. School Spirit week and Homecoming events are planned by the senior committee and is held the Friday before the Thanksgiving recess.

The school was founded in 1987. Its name commemorates Benjamin Banneker, an African American scientist, surveyor, almanac author and farmer.

Student demographics
As of the 2014–15 school year, the school had an enrollment of 920 students and 43.0 classroom teachers (on an FTE basis), for a student–teacher ratio of 21.4:1. There were 414 students (45.0% of enrollment) eligible for free lunch and 49 (5.3% of students) eligible for reduced-cost lunch.

There are 831 students in the school. The demographics are 83.39% African American, 12.03% Hispanic or Latino, 2.76% Asian, 1.5% White (non-Hispanic) and 0.32% Native American.

Extracurricular activities
Benjamin Banneker Academy is known for its many extracurricular activities, which include a variety of sport teams, clubs and community service organizations.

Some special events that happen at Banneker annually are the fashion shows that are presented by the school's fashion clubs, "ETC Fashion Group" and the "Senior Fashion Show" and Homecoming.

Clubs
ETC Fashion Group (EMPOWERMENT THROUGH CREATIVITY)
TMD (Teens Making a Difference)
Goddess (For Young Women's Empowerment)
The Debate Team
NYC Otaku (Anime Club)
The Pre-Med Club
NOLA (Banneker Rebuilds New Orleans)
The Robotics Team
The Latino Club
The French Club
S.P.I.T (Soulful Poets In Training)
Student Government Organization (SGO)
The Drama Club
Chorus
Chess Team
Banneker Sisters United
Banneker Brothers United
The Yearbook Committee
The Senior Committee
The Africa Tours Club
Nurange Dance Ensemble
STOKED NYC (Skateboarding/Snowboarding/Surfing)
Knitting and Crocheting Club
Step Team
Robotics

Sports teams

Baseball Boys Varsity
Basketball Boys Varsity
Basketball Boys Jr. Varsity
Basketball Girls Varsity
Basketball Girls Jr. Varsity
Bowling Boys Varsity
Cheerleading
Cross Country Girls Varsity
Cross Country Boys Varsity
Fencing Boys Varsity
Fencing Girls Varsity
Indoor Track Girls Varsity
Indoor Track Boys Varsity
Outdoor Track Girls Varsity
Outdoor Track Boys Varsity
Soccer Girls Varsity
Soccer Boys Varsity
Softball Girls Varsity
Tennis Boys Varsity
Tennis Girls Varsity
Volleyball Girls Varsity
Volleyball Boys Varsity
Rowing

References

See also
Empowerment school

Public high schools in Brooklyn
Benjamin Banneker